John Massey  (1651–1716) was an English clergyman and academic administrator at the University of Oxford.

Masey was born in Bristol and educated at Magdalen College, Oxford. In 1672 he became a Fellow of Merton College, Oxford. He was Proctor of Oxford University from 1684 to 1686; and Dean (head) of Christ Church, Oxford  from 1686 to 1688. In later life he became a Roman Catholic.

References

1651 births
1716 deaths
Clergy from Bristol
Fellows of Merton College, Oxford
Alumni of Magdalen College, Oxford
Deans of Christ Church, Oxford